Achham is a district located in Sudurpashchim province of Nepal. It is one of the nine districts of the province. The district, with Mangalsen as its district headquarters, covers an area of 1,692 km and has a population (2011) of 257,477.

Etymology
There are many cultural meaning about the naming of the district but one interesting folklore is that:

History

Achham was a part of Doti Kingdom during medieval era. Nepal annexed Doti in 1790 It remained part of Doti District until 1961. On 13 April 1961, Achham district carved out from Doti District and declared a separate district

Geography and Climate
The district is surrounded by Bajura District in the North, Doti District in the West, Dailekh District in the East and Surkhet District in the South.

Rivers
The  district  has  31  rivers  in  total,  the  main  being  the  Karnali,  Seti,  Budhiganga,  Ekadi,  Kailash  Khola, Lungreligad,  Pravaligad,  Kashagad,  Saranigad,  Ardoligad,  Talagad  and  Barlegad.

Demographics
At the time of the 2011 Nepal census, Achham District had a population of 257,477, in which female comprises 137,469 (54%) and male comprises 120,008 (46%). Density of the area is 154 people per km2. 66.4% of the population spoke Nepali, 32.5% Achhami, 0.4% Magar, 0.1% Doteli, 0.1% Maithili and 0.3% other languages as their first language.

In terms of ethnicity/caste, 55.5% were Chhetri, 16.2% other Dalit, 10.2% Hill Brahmin, 9.5% Kami, 3.1% Damai/Dholi, 2.5% Thakuri, 0.6% Magar, 0.6% Sarki, 0.4% Lohar, 0.3% Badi, 0.2% Bengali, 0.2% Sanyasi/Dasnami, 0.1% Majhi, 0.1% Musalman, 0.1% Tamang, 0.1% Teli, 0.1% other Terai, 0.1% Tharu and 0.2% others.

In terms of religion, 99.4% were Hindu, 0.3% Buddhist, 0.1% Christian and 0.1% Muslim.

In terms of literacy, 55.4% could read and write, 3.9% could only read and 40.6% could neither read nor write.

Administration
The district is administered by District Coordination Committee (Legislative), District Administration Office (Executive) and District Court (Judicial) as follows:

Administrative Divisions
Accham is divided into total of ten local level bodies, of which four are urban and six are rural.

Transportation
Achham is one of the remotest districts of Nepal.  It is accessible by automobile from Kathmandu and Nepalgunj via a paved road that runs along the western border of Nepal from Dhangadhi. The unpaved road of Mid-Hill Highway through Dailakh district also traverses to Mangalsen by crossing Karnali at Rakam.

Mangalsen, the district headquarters, is an eight-hour walk and a 2.5 hour drive from Sanphebagar – a town in Achham sporting a non-functional domestic airport. A bridge crosses the Budhiganga River in Sanphebagar allowing access during high water, a second bridge over the Kailash River.  During 2009/2010, the government of Nepal has constructed a paved road connecting Sanphebagar to Mangalsen.  The district is served by two hospitals, the government district hospital in Mangalsen and one recently opened in Bayalpata named Bayalpata Hospital that is a collaboration between the government and the non-profit organization Nyaya Health.

Education
71% of men aged five and above are literate in Achham compared to 75% at the national level, only 43% of such women in the district can read and write (against 57% across Nepal).

FM radio and newspapers 

Achham Besd six FM radio and three newspapers are running now. In this district Ramaroshan Daiy. The Ramaroshan Daily editor is Shiba Raj Dhungana. He is Gorkhapatra Nation Daily (government applied), District reporter. Dhungana has also the Secretary of the Federation of Nepali Journalists Achham Branch. More than 25 journalists are working here. Dhungana lead the achham besd journalst.

Newspapers
 Ramaroshan Daily Khaptad News daily Miracle weekly''

FM Radio
 Ramaroshan
 Janapriya
 Society
 Achham
 Panchadewol
 Paribartan
 Redio Bannigadhi 93.4

See also
Panchadewal Binayak

References

External links
UN map of VDC boundaries, water features and roads in Achham
 

 
Districts of Nepal established in 1962